S2 Games  was a video game development company which was founded by Marc "Maliken" DeForest, Jesse Hayes, and Sam McGrath, based in Rohnert Park, California. They also had a development location in Kalamazoo, Michigan.

History
Their first project (a real-time strategy, third-person shooter and role-playing game hybrid), Savage: The Battle for Newerth, was released in the Summer of 2003. They released its sequel, Savage 2: A Tortured Soul, on January 16, 2008, and are independently publishing and distributing it. Their third installment in the Savage series, Heroes of Newerth, based heavily around Defense of the Ancients, was released on May 12, 2010.

In 2015, S2 Games sold the rights to Heroes of Newerth to Garena to focus on Strife, their second-generation MOBA.

Garena subsequently moved Heroes of Newerth to Frostburn Studios, a Kalamazoo, Michigan based subsidiary of Garena.

Titles
Savage: The Battle for Newerth (2003) (Windows, Macintosh, Linux)
Savage 2: A Tortured Soul (2008) (Windows, Macintosh, Linux)
Heroes of Newerth (2010) (Windows, Macintosh, Linux)
Strife (2015) (Windows, Macintosh, Linux)
Savage Resurrection (2016) (Windows)
Brawl of Ages (2017)  (Windows)

Key events
In 2003, S2 Games released Savage: The Battle for Newerth, their first commercial game.
In 2004, three former S2 Games employees left the company to form Offset Software.
In 2006, S2 Games re-released Savage: The Battle for Newerth, as freeware.
In 2008, S2 Games released Savage 2: A Tortured Soul.
In 2009, S2 Games re-released Savage 2: A Tortured Soul as freeware.
In 2010, S2 Games released Heroes of Newerth.
In 2011, S2 Games re-released Heroes of Newerth as freeware/free-to-play.
In 2012, S2 Games made all heroes in Heroes of Newerth completely free for online play.
In 2012, over 10,000,000 Heroes of Newerth user accounts had been registered.
In 2013, S2 Games announced Strife an upcoming "second generation MOBA".
In 2015, S2 Games sold the property of Heroes of Newerth from its label into the hands of Garena and Frostburn Studios.
In 2017, Savage Resurrection was re-released under a free-to-play model.
In 2018, Strife and Brawl of Ages servers were shut down and S2 Games was quietly closed.

References

External links

 
Video game companies based in California
Video game development companies
Software companies based in the San Francisco Bay Area
Rohnert Park, California
Video game companies established in 2003
Video game companies disestablished in 2018
Defunct video game companies of the United States
Defunct companies based in the San Francisco Bay Area
2003 establishments in California
2018 disestablishments in California